The Encyclopaedia of Sexual Knowledge, under the editorship of Dr. Norman Haire (1892–1952), is the first of a trilogy of sexual encyclopaedias by Arthur Koestler writing under the pen name of ‘Dr. A. Costler’. It is the English version, published by Koestler's cousin Francis Aldor in 1934, of the book L'encyclopédie de la vie sexuelle that Koestler in 1933 wrote, together with "A. Willy" (the pseudonym of his other cousin Willy Aldor) and the German Dr. Ludwig Levy-Lenz. The second book is Sexual Anomalies and Perversions, Physical and Psychological Development, Diagnoses and Treatment. The title of the third book is, in the original French edition of 1939, L’Encyclopédie de la famille. This third book was subsequently translated into English and published under various titles and with changes to the structure and text of the original edition. The name of ‘Dr. Costler’ (or 'A. Coester') as the author or co-author of the book is omitted from later editions.

 
Koestler wrote that working from standard text books and reference works "I condensed and distilled the Encyclopædia at a rate of about four thousand words a day."

The background to Koestler’s collaboration in the writing of these books is set out in detail in his autobiography The Invisible Writing, Chapter XIX. ‘Introducing Dr. Coster’. As noted there, The Encyclopœdia was highly successful and became a best-seller in several languages, but Koestler himself had little benefit of it, being shamelessly exploited by the publisher – a crooked cousin of his. Koestler received a flat payment of sixty pounds and no royalties from the sales, which amounted to tens of thousands.

Contents 
The book is divided into ten ‘Books’ (main chapters) and two Appendices. Each ‘Book’ consists of several Sections and Chapters. The book contains numerous monochrome illustrations and 32 colour plates. 836 numbered pages.

Preface
Book One: Sexual Art of Primitive and Other Races
Book Two: The Road to a Full Sex Life
Book Three: Sexual Organs in Function
Book Four: Sexual Intercourse
Book Five: Men and Women in their Everyday Relations
Book Six: Women’s Sexual Impulse
Book Seven: Procreation
Book Eight: Birth Control
Book Nine: Imperfections of Love
Book Ten: Delaying Sexual Death
Appendix I: (Untitled)
Appendix II: Forbidden Fashions – Forbidden Nudity

References

Books by Arthur Koestler
Encyclopedias of sexuality
Self-help books
Sex manuals
1934 non-fiction books
20th-century encyclopedias